Maccabi Arazim Ramat Gan is a handball club from Ramat Gan in Israel. Maccabi Arazim Ramat Gan competes in the Ligat Ha'Al.

Honours 

 Ligat Ha'Al
 Winners (12) : 1968, 1969, 1970, 1971, 1978, 1980, 1981, 1982, 1983, 1984, 1985, 1986

 Israel Handball Cup
 Winners (6) : 1970, 1980, 1981, 1983, 1984, 1986

European record

Team

Current squad 

Squad for the 2016–17 season

Goalkeepers
  Rotem Gershon
  Analia Grauer

Wingers
RW
  Liron Nimni
LW 
  Danielle Danan
  Hadar Dorenboust
  Nicole Padalon
Line Players 
  Elina Farbman
  Shani Rahel Levinkind
  Nofar Ruf

Back players
LB
  Yuliya Bulava
CB 
  Julianna Banczik
  Ortal Elbaz 
  Elena Rozenshtein 
RB
  Sharon Akler
  Oshri Cohen
  Ekaterina Melnik

External links
 Official website
 EHF Club profile

References 

Israeli handball clubs
Sport in Ramat Gan